Pruteni is a commune in Făleşti District, Moldova. It is composed of four villages: Cuzmenii Vechi, Drujineni, Pruteni and Valea Rusului.

References

Communes of Fălești District